Student Politicism was a student political group in Hong Kong. Founded on 26 May 2020, the group was one of only few pro-democracy organisations still existing in Hong Kong as of September 2021, before it was dissolved on 24 September 2021 after core members were charged under the National Security Law.

History

"To test the red line" 
Student Politicism was founded on 26 May 2020, just days after the Chinese Government announced the start of enacting the National Security Law. The group name "" was taken from their slogan "", meaning "venerate studying to enlighten mind; defend citizens to ponder politics." Wong Yat-chin, the convenor of the group, once described the value of the group is "to test the red line of the regime", and to “bring hope to people”.

Student Politicism voiced support on the democratization of Hong Kong, aimed to raise the public awareness on education, local culture, and various social issues, including the detainment of 12 Hongkongers in Chinese water, while supporting the jailed protesters by collecting supplies for prisoners and letters of support. It gained prominence after frequently setting up street booths to advocate their ideas.

Following the imposition of National Security Law in Hong Kong by China, the pro-democracy protests and movements lost the momentum. Student Politicism became one of the few remaining local pro-democracy organisations that continued to run street booths. The core members were repeatedly arrested on suspicion of illegal assembly or sedition, and were warned of possibly breaching the National Security Law by the police.

Disbandment and aftermath 
On 20 September 2021, Wong Yat-chin, secretary-general Chan Chi-sum, and former spokeswoman Jessica Chuwho reportedly had left the group were arrested under the National Security Law. Spokeswoman Alice Wong Yuen-lam was arrested on 22September after she had reportedly turned herself in at a police station. The police alleged them to have incited hatred against Hong Kong's government by urging people not to use the LeaveHomeSafe Covid tracking app and by other means, in addition to calling to prepare for another "revolution" through martial arts training. Four were taken to court later, charged for inciting subversion, and all denied bail on 21 and 23 September 2021. On 15 October 2021, Chu was granted bail while the other three core members had their bail applications again rejected.

On 24 September, days after the crackdown, the group announced its disbandment, citing the "lack of foreseeable space" to continue its mission.

On 28 July 2022, Wong Yat-chin, Chan Chi-sum, Jessica Chu, and Alice Wong all pleaded guilty to conspiring to incite subversion. Chu applied for her bail to be revoked. The four returned to court on 24 September, on which day the prosecution questioned the credibility of the mitigation submission of Wong Yat-chin, citing a social media post by him.   

On 23 October 2022, Wong Yat-chin, Chan and Chu were sentenced to 30 to 36 months in prison, while Wong Yuen-lam was sent to a training centre.

References 

Student organisations in Hong Kong
Political organisations based in Hong Kong